The Ulster Canal is a canal running through part of County Armagh, County Tyrone and County Fermanagh in Northern Ireland and County Monaghan in the Republic of Ireland. The Ulster Canal was built between 1825 and 1842 and was 74 km (46 mi) long with 26 locks. It ran from Charlemont on the River Blackwater to near Wattlebridge on the Finn River, south-east of Upper Lough Erne. It was an ill-considered venture, with the locks built narrower than the other Irish waterways, preventing through trade, and an inadequate water supply. It was an abject failure commercially, and contributed to the collapse of the Lagan Navigation Company, who took it over from the government but were then refused permission to abandon it when they could not afford the maintenance costs. It finally closed in 1931. Waterways Ireland started work on rebuilding the canal at its southern end in 2015.

History
In 1778, a proposal was made for a canal from Ballyshannon to the Lower Lough Erne. The estimated cost of the scheme was £32,000, but it was already seen as part of a larger project, since a further £8,000 would have provided a link to Enniskillen, Belturbet and Ballyconnell. A future link from Ballyconnell to Ballymore, along the Woodford River valley, and on to Lough Scurr and the River Shannon at Leitrim was suggested but not costed. It would thus be an important section of a trans-Irish waterway, linking Belfast in the east to Limerick in the west, which would compete with a similar link formed by the Grand Canal and the Royal Canal further to the south. Government funding was forthcoming in 1783, and a section of the canal was constructed between Ballyshannon and Belleek, with Richard Evans, the engineer for the Royal Canal, overseeing the work, which included a lock at Belleek. The project stalled in 1794, when funds ran out.

The Directors General of Inland Navigation asked Evans to prepare an estimate of the costs to finish the work in 1801, but no action was taken. By 1814, the Directors General were faced with problems of unemployment in the area, and a canal from Lough Neagh to Lough Erne was seen as a way to provide jobs for the local population. John Killaly was commissioned to survey the route of such a link, and produced his report in February 1815. His estimate of £233,000 would provide a canal which ascended through six locks from Wattlebridge to a summit near Monaghan and then descended through another sixteen to reach Lough Neagh.

A public meeting was held at Monaghan in February 1817, and despite strong local support, including an offer to provide two-thirds of the cost by a group of landowners and businessmen, the Directors General did not take any action, and the project remained an idea. The proprietors who had taken over the Lagan Canal in 1810 saw the link as a way to increase traffic on their own canal, and public support for it grew steadily, until a large group of people requested parliamentary approval for a revised scheme, which was very similar to Killaly's of a decade previously. The government remained unconvinced that they would receive a return on any money advanced, and so the Directors General could not act. Finally, in 1825, a private company was authorised to construct the canal. It was estimated to cost £160,050, as a new survey had produced a plan which only needed eighteen locks.

The company then applied to the borrow £100,000 from the Exchequer Bill Loan Commission, a body created under the Poor Employment Act of 1817. The engineer Thomas Telford was sent to Ireland to inspect the plans and estimates, which he duly approved, but the interest rates on the loan could not be agreed, and three further Acts of Parliament were obtained before a loan of £120,000 was agreed. Problems were then experienced with the contractors, Henry, Mullins and MacMahon from Dublin, who were awarded the construction contract in 1832. Telford then decided that there were serious problems with the design and that a new survey should be made. This increased the number of locks to 26, and the contractors were asked for a new estimate. Agreement could not be reached, and they eventually withdrew from the project. William Cubitt succeeded Telford after he died in 1834. The canal was eventually finished in 1841. From the summit pound, nineteen locks descended to Lough Neagh, and in the other direction, seven descended to Lough Erne. Water was supplied by Quig Lough reservoir, a lake near Monaghan which had been enlarged. The project had cost over £230,000.

Operation
The canal failed to generate significant trade, as the water supply was inadequate, and goods had to be transhipped at either end into narrower boats. In addition, there was no link to the River Shannon to generate through traffic, and unlikely to be one while the canal did not prosper. The company were unable to repay any of the loan made by the Exchequer Bill Loan Commissioners, and in 1851, The Office of Public Works (The O.P.W., also known as the Board of Works) took control of it. After cosmetic repairs, it was leased to William Dargan, who had built most of it as contractor, and ran the only significant carrying operation on the waterway. The Ulster Railway reached Monaghan in 1858, and three years later the canal was in a ruinous state. Sir John Macneill, the Irish railway engineer, suggested that the best use of it was to drain the water and let cows graze on it.

In an attempt to recoup their losses, the government took control of it again in 1865, closed it, and spent £22,000 over eight years on repairs. Their main priority was to secure an adequate water supply, but when the canal reopened in 1873, this proved not to have been achieved. Maintenance costs far exceeded revenue, and what little traffic there was, was confined to the Lough Erne end of the canal, as the summit was mostly unnavigable, and there was only sufficient water during eight months of every year. However, there was a slight improvement in traffic in 1880, when W. R. Rea, the secretary of the Lagan Navigation Company, set up a new carrying company using smaller boats. There was a vague promise of government aid for any company interested in taking it over. A series of negotiations then took place, but the government failed on three occasions to pass a bill to authorise the sellout to the Lagan Canal. They eventually suggested that the Lagan Canal should try to obtain a private bill to achieve the aim, and they were successful in doing so in 1888.

Decline
The House of Lords had succeeded in removing a clause from the bill which allowed the Lagan Canal company to close the Ulster Canal after ten years, and they were saddled with a liability in perpetuity. Vast sums were spent on maintenance, compared to income, and although some trade developed, profits from the Lagan Canal and the Coalisland Canal, which they also owned, were swallowed up in trying to keep the Ulster Canal open. The company never really recovered from the acquisition. The last boat to enter the canal did so in 1929, and a "warrant of abandonment" was finally obtained on 9 January 1931. This allowed them to abandon the section of the canal in Northern Ireland. An "order of release", obtained on 15 April, removed all liability for maintenance.

A similar order in the newly established Republic of Ireland was refused. In the 1940s Monaghan County Council was granted a Judgement Mortgage on the canal in lieu of unpaid rates. Lagan Navigation offered to give the canal to the Council in lieu of monies owed, but the Council declined, having been advised that the upkeep of bridges etc. would be beyond their ability to finance. Lagan Navigation Co was dissolved under the Inland Navigation Act (NI) 1954. This left the stretch through Monaghan as 'ownerless goods' (bona vacantia) and as such fell to the Minister for Finance. Ownership in the Republic passed back to The O.P.W. under the State Property Act 1954. In the early 1970s, Monaghan County Council, Monaghan Urban District Council and Clones Urban District Council each acquired some sections of the canal under the Derelict Sites Act 1961. Stretches in County Monaghan which were not derelict at that time (i.e., which were being occupied) could not be acquired and ownership remains with The O.P.W..

Route

The canal follows a fairly straight south-west to north-east course, from the island and townland of Derrykerrib, at the mouth of the Finn River, very near Wattlebridge in the south-east of County Fermanagh, to Charlemont in the north-west of County Armagh, where it joins the River Blackwater. There were two locks close to the Finn River, two beyond Clones, and three near Smithborough, where the summit was reached. Two locks drop the level before Monaghan is reached and there is a flight of seven shortly after the town. The border with County Armagh in Northern Ireland crosses the canal below them. There are two isolated locks near Middletown, and the a level section before the canal reaches a gorge to the west of Benburb. Fitting the canal through here presented a lot of problems for the builders, as another six locks were required in awkward terrain. There is another lock above Blackwatertown, and the final lock below Charlemont, before the canal joins the River Blackwater.

Of the large number of bridges that crossed the canal, 56 remained in 2002.

Restoration
A feasibility study into the possible reopening of the waterway was carried out in 1998 (and revised in 2000). The report found that there were no insurmountable engineering problems to such a plan but issues such as lock capacity/size and the adequacy of the water supply would need to be addressed. All historic locks would need to be significantly widened to at least  to accommodate modern waterway craft. A restored canal would create significant long-term financial benefits to the local economy; however, the report concluded that unless the reasons that caused it to be an abject failure in the first place were addressed, there seemed little point in restoring the canal.

In 2004 Waterways Ireland announced that a reopened canal would bring enormous benefits to the areas it passed through, because it would reconnect with the already restored Shannon–Erne Waterway (opened 23 May 1994). Rather than being a true restoration, it involved the construction of a state-of-the-art waterway along a historic route, and a similar approach would be required on the Ulster Canal.

At the North/South Ministerial Council meeting on 17 July 2007, it was announced that the governments would work towards the restoration of the stretch of the canal linking the town of Clones, in County Monaghan, to Upper Lough Erne. The cost of the development would be €35 million, paid for by the Irish Exchequer. In August 2010, Waterways Ireland published an Ulster Canal Restoration Plan, an Environmental Report and an Appropriate Assessment. In September 2010 it held two Public Information Days, one in Clones, Co. Monaghan, and one in Newtownbutler, Co. Fermanagh, and invited written comments on its plans by 30 September 2010. 
Reports on the proposed restoration were available in both Northern Ireland and the Republic.

Despite a few objections, Minister Heather Humphreys announced in February 2015 that the Irish government had given its approval to Waterways Ireland for the restoration of the canal between Castle Saunderson and Erne basin. The funding would come from Waterways Ireland. On 24 April 2015 the project was formally launched, when a meeting was held at Derrykerrib Bridge, attended by Heather Humphreys and representatives of Waterways Ireland. The first phase involved extending the Erne Navigation from Quivvy Lough to Castle Saunderson, near Belturbet. Dredging of a section of the Finn River was expected to take place in Autumn 2015, but this was delayed, with "contractual issues" being cited as the cause. Waterways Ireland's budget for 2016 included €2.7 million earmarked for the Ulster Canal project. There were further delays caused by poor ground conditions, flooding, and the need to maintain access for residents while the work was ongoing. The new bridge and its associated channel were expected to be completed by April 2018. The first phase of the Ulster Canal restoration was nearing completion in September 2019.

With phase 1 completed and open to the public, funding for phase 2 of the project was announced. The Taoiseach's Shared Island fund promised €6 million in December 2020, and a further €5.57 million was provided by the Department of Rural and Community Development on 28 April 2021. This will fund a relatively short section, detached from the Phase 1 section, between Clones and Clonfad in County Monaghan. Crucially, it will include the provision of a sustainable water supply. The main project is expected to be completed in mid-2023, with some of the amenities taking a little longer.

See also

Canals of the United Kingdom
Canals of Ireland

Bibliography

References

BBC Schools - Canals

External links
Inland Waterways Association of Ireland's index of information on the Ulster Canal
Industrial Heritage Ireland Info page on Ulster Canal
Ulster Canal, Benburb

Canal restoration
Canals in Northern Ireland
Geography of County Armagh
Transport in County Armagh
Geography of County Tyrone
Transport in County Tyrone
Geography of County Fermanagh
Transport in County Fermanagh
Canals in Ireland
Geography of County Monaghan
Transport in County Monaghan
Canals opened in 1842
1842 establishments in Ireland